Acerorhinus was a genus of rhinoceros of the tribe Aceratheriini endemic to Asia from the Miocene, living from 13.6—7.0 mya existing for approximately .

Among other locations, well-preserved Acerorhinus skull specimens have been found at Kerassiá in North Eubonea, Greece.

Taxonomy
Acerorhinus was named by Kretzoi (1942). Its type is Aceratherium zernowi. Originally, many species in this genus including A. zernowi were assigned to Chilotherium. It was assigned to Aceratheriini by Kaya and Heissig (2001); and to Aceratheriini by Antoine and Saraç (2005).

Description
Acerorhinus had very short legs, more like Teleoceras than other Aceratherines. While most other Aceratherines were grazers, Acerorhinus had brachyodont teeth which indicate a preferences for browsing.

Like other Aceratherines, it was hornless and had tusk-like incisors.

References

Miocene rhinoceroses
Miocene mammals of Europe
Miocene mammals of Asia
Fossil taxa described in 1942